Kumuk is a rural locality (a selo) in Kurakhsky District, Republic of Dagestan, Russia. The population was 1,167 as of 2010. There are 22 streets.

Geography 
Kumuk is located 11 km southeast of Kurakh (the district's administrative centre) by road, on the Gulgerychay River. Kukaz and Shtul are the nearest rural localities.

Nationalities 
Lezgins live there.

References 

Rural localities in Kurakhsky District